The Shire of Maffra was a local government area about  north-northwest of Sale, the major regional centre in central Gippsland, Victoria, Australia.

History

Maffra was incorporated as a shire in October 1875. Part of its Eastern Riding was annexed to the Shire of Avon on 2 May 1917.

On 2 December 1994, the Shire of Maffra was abolished, and along with the City of Sale, the Shires of Alberton and Avon, and parts of the Shire of Rosedale, was merged into the newly created Shire of Wellington.

Wards

The Shire of Maffra was divided into four ridings, each of which elected three councillors:
 Town Riding
 Central Riding
 East Riding
 West Riding

Shire presidents

Towns and localities
 Bellbird Corner
 Boisdale
 Briagolong
 Bundalaguah
 Bushy Park
 Coongulla
 Glenmaggie
 Heyfield
 Licola
 Maffra*
 Mewburn Park
 Newry
 Seaton
 Tinamba
 Valencia Creek

* Council seat.

Population

* Estimate in the 1958 Victorian Year Book.

References

External links
 Victorian Places - Maffra Shire

Maffra